R. Sugathan,  (23 December 1901 –  14 February 1970), popularly known as Sugathansir, was an Indian Communist leader and an early trade unionist of Kerala. He was elected to the Travancore-Cochin Assembly in 1952 (Alleppey) & 1954 from Maraikkulam (Mararikulam), followed by first Kerala Legislative Assembly elections in 1957 from Karthigapally (Karthikappally) in present Alappuzha district, and second assembly also from Karthikappally as a CPI member.

Early life and education
Born R. Shreedharan in Kerala. After passing his Malayalam Middle school he came under influence of Buddhist doctrine and soon changed his name to R. Sugathan.

Career
He was an active member of the Sahodara Sangham (The Brotherhood Movement), later he left his teaching job at a private school to join SNDP Yogam, where he worked hard to eliminate caste as an institution, and also SNDP's political wing, Ezhava Political League, and when Congress came into existence in the state he became its part. In 1938, he organized coir factory workers into union and was arrested for agitating, and sentenced to two years rigorous imprisonment.

Later, he became involved with the Travancore Labour Association and finally he left Congress joined the Communist Party in 1942, he was imprisoned twice again in the following years.

Legacy
In 2008, his death anniversary on 14 February was observed as 'flag day' by Communist Party of India (CPI) at its State conference at Thiruvananthapuram

References

Further reading
 Immortal heroes: lives of Communist leaders, by Communist Party of India. Pub. Communist Party of India, 1975. p. 156.
 Sakhavu R. Sugathan (Comrade R. Sugathan) by Raghavan Puthupally. Kottayam: Current Books, 1999.

External links
  Kerala Legislators, Profiles up to 2006 p 240

1901 births
1970 deaths
Trade unionists from Kerala
Narayana Guru
Communist Party of India politicians from Kerala
People from Alappuzha district
Indian independence activists from Kerala
Indian National Congress politicians from Kerala
Kerala MLAs 1957–1959
Kerala MLAs 1960–1964